The history of the Jews in San Francisco began with the California Gold Rush in the second half of the 19th-century. 

The San Francisco Bay Area has the fourth largest Jewish population in the U.S. behind the New York area, southeast Florida and metropolitan Los Angeles. Jewish San Franciscans played a significant role in the economic and cultural development of San Francisco and California. As of 2011, some 6% of the city's residents are of Jewish descent.

History

19th-century
The small Mexican settlement of Yerba Buena was renamed San Francisco in 1847 and quickly became the most important city in the American West. The discovery of gold in California in 1848 brought many people to San Francisco, including Jews.

San Francisco's Jewish population was the second largest Jewish community in the country by 1880. There have been ethnic and class differences within the Jewish community in San Francisco, which has spawned disputes on the earliest of history. In 1849, the first Jewish service of San Francisco began as a minyan at Lewis Abraham Franklin's tent store on Jackson Street at Kearny Street, with 30 Jews from Poland, Prussia, Bavaria and the Eastern United States, and it was initially Orthodox.

In 1851, Congregation Emanu-El and Congregation Sherith Israel of San Francisco were joined as a single synagogue; but soon after they split into two congregations. Congregation Emanu-El was mostly Bavarian German immigrants, and Congregation Sherith Israel was mostly immigrants from Eastern Europe, Poland, and England.

20th-century
On April 18, 1906, an earthquake and subsequent fires devastated over 80% of San Francisco. The destruction affected all its citizens, including the nearly 30,000 Jews who lived in the city.

Notable people

Aaron Fleishhacker 
Aaron Fleishhacker was a German-born American businessman who founded the San Francisco-based paper box manufacturer, "A. Fleishhacker & Co." Fleishhacker was also active during the Gold Rush with the formation of Comstock silver mines in Nevada. Fleishhacker was a founding member of Congregation Emanu-El in San Francisco and a local philanthropist. His son  Herbert Fleishhacker continued his father's legacy.

Florence Prag Kahn 
Florence Prag Kahn was the first Jewish woman to serve in the United States Congress for California's 4th district. Her family moved to San Francisco, California in 1869, when she was child. She graduated from the San Francisco Girls' High School, before attending University of California, Berkeley.

Julius Kahn 
Julius Kahn was a United States Congressman in California's 4th district and served 12 terms, after his death his wife Florence served in his former office. He has been described by the American Jerusalem as "among the most influential Jews in San Francisco—as well as national–civic life, from the middle of the 19th century into the 1930s". Representative Kahn authored the Kahn Exclusion Act, ultimately enacted as the Chinese Exclusion Act, a United States federal law that that prohibited all immigration of Chinese laborers.

Levi Strauss 
Levi Strauss left New York for San Francisco in order to supplied gold miners with sturdy denim pants. In 1853, Levi Strauss & Co. was founded as "David Stern & Levi Strauss" and was located at 90 Sacramento Street near to the docks of San Francisco. The world-renowned blue jeans were invented by Latvian Jew Jacob W. Davis and Levi Strauss, who patented their design in 1873.

Adolph Sutro 
Adolph Sutro was the first Jewish mayor of San Francisco from 1895 until 1897. At one time Sutro owned one-twelfth of the acreage of San Francisco. He purchased the Cliff House in the early 1880s, and one thousand acres of land facing the ocean, now called Sutro heights. The Sutro Baths, located on the north side of Ocean Beach, south of the Golden Gate Bridge, opened as the world's largest indoor swimming complex in 1896.

See also

 History of the Jews in the American West
 History of the Jews in the United States

References

Further reading

External links
 San Francisco Bay Area Site of the Jewish Virtual Library

San Francisco
 
Jewish